Rafael  Pereira may refer to:

 Rafael Pereira (footballer, born 1984), Brazilian football centre-back
 Rafael Pereira (hurdler) (born 1997), Brazilian hurdler
 Rafa Pereira (born 2001), Portuguese football midfielder

See also
 Rafael Carioca (born 1989), full name Rafael de Souza Pereira, Brazilian football defensive midfielder